Same as It Never Was may refer to:

Same as It Never Was (novel), a 2003 novel by Claire Scovell LaZebnik, the basis of a 2006 TV movie
"Same as It Never Was" (TMNT 2003), a 2005 episode of the Teenage Mutant Ninja Turtles TV series
Same as It Never Was, the name of shop in the 2005–2010 Ghost Whisperer TV series
Same as It Never Was (album), a  2008 album by The Herbaliser
 "Same As It Never Was", a song performed by the Weathermen on the 2002 album Def Jux Presents 2
 "Same as It Never Was", a song by Joanne Shaw Taylor from the 2010 album Diamonds in the Dirt
 "same as it never was", by Cyril Vouilloz(Rylsee) (a travelling Swiss artist)

See also
Same as It Ever Was (disambiguation)